Kelling is a surname. Notable people with the surname include:

Charles Kelling (1818–1898), New Zealand emigration agent, farmer and community leader
Fedor Kelling (1820–1909), German-born New Zealand politician
Georg Kelling (1866–1945), German internist and surgeon 
George L. Kelling (1935–2019), American criminologist
Graeme Kelling (1957–2004), Scottish musician